Dominique Monet, QC (January 2, 1865 – February 6, 1923) was a Canadian lawyer, politician, and judge.

Born in St-Michel de Napierville, Canada East, the son of Dominique Monet, Monet was educated at L'Assomption College and received an LL.D. from Laval University in 1889. He was called to the Quebec Bar in 1889 and was created a Queen's Counsel in 1899. He practiced law in Saint-Rémi, Montreal and Saint-Jean. He was first elected to the House of Commons of Canada for the electoral district of Napierville in the 1891 federal election. A Liberal, he was re-elected in the 1896 and 1900 election for the electoral district of Laprairie—Napierville.

In 1904, he was elected as the Liberal candidate to the Legislative Assembly of Quebec for the electoral district of Napierville. In February 1905, he was made a Minister Without Portfolio in the cabinet of Simon-Napoléon Parent and soon after was appointed Minister of Colonization and Public Works for a brief time. In October 1905, he was appointed Protonotary for the district of Montreal. In 1908, he was made a judge of the Superior Court for the district of d'Iberville.

He died while at sea near San Juan, Puerto Rico on February 6, 1923. He was buried in Saint-Jean.

References
 
 

1865 births
1923 deaths
Liberal Party of Canada MPs
Members of the House of Commons of Canada from Quebec
People who died at sea
Judges in Quebec
Quebec Liberal Party MNAs
People from Montérégie
Canadian King's Counsel